The Millennium Bridge (Russian: Мост Милленниум) is a cable-stayed bridge that spans Kazanka River, in Kazan, Russia. Its name originates from Kazan's thousandth anniversary, widely celebrated in 2005, and from the shape of its M-like pylon. 

The construction of the bridge began in 2004; the first part was ready in 2005 and the second part in 2007. The building cost was approximately €94 million.

The main part of this bridge is the 45-m pylon which looks like the letter M. This form originates from Meñyıllıq (Cyrillic: Меңъеллык), the Tatar for thousand years old, or its Latin variant Millennium. The roadway carries three lanes of traffic and a pedestrian walkway in each direction. The bridge connects Gorky park and Fatix Ämirxan Avenue.

Cable-stayed bridges in Russia
Bridges completed in 2005
Buildings and structures in Kazan
Road bridges in Russia